"Last Night" is a song by American R&B group Az Yet, produced by Babyface and Mervyn Warren, and released as the first single from the group's debut album, Az Yet (1996). The song became the group's first hit, reaching number nine on the US Billboard Hot 100, number one on the Billboard Hot R&B Singles chart, and number four on the Billboard Rhythmic Top 40 chart. Additionally, it reached number two in Australia, number six in New Zealand, and number eight in the Netherlands. The song was also included on The Nutty Professor soundtrack.

Critical reception
Larry Flick from Billboard viewed the song as "yet another gem" from the soundtrack to The Nutty Professor. He added, "Az Yet is a charismatic male quintet that aims to come across as a mature alternative to the army of smooth groups currently vying to harmonize their way to the platinum land owned by Boyz II Men. Honey-soaked notes are poured over old-school soul music carrying the unmistakable stamp of producer/writer Babyface (does this man ever take a nap?). Engaging as can be." Peter Miro from Cash Box felt that "Last Night" "is the most potent offering on their 12-track collection of ballads, with lyrics ladies will cling to endlessly." A reviewer from Music Week rated the song four out of five, adding that "the Philadelphia soul quintet show they are the masters of close harmony vocalising on this seductive debut". Ralph Tee from the magazine's RM Dance Update said, "Already a Billboard hit, and also on the Nutty Professor soundtrack it's a touch MOR vocally, though the harmonies are the standout feature beneath the shuffle beat rhythms."

Music video
There are two versions of the song's accompanying music video; one with clips from The Nutty Professor and the other without.

Personnel and credits
Credits are adapted from the album's liner notes.
 Az Yet: vocals
 Babyface: writer, producer, keyboards and drum programming
 Keith Andes: writer, producer, keyboards and drum programming
 Mervyn Warren: co-producer (vocals)
 Brad Gilderman: engineer
 Kyle Bess, Paul Boutin: assistant engineers (recording)
 Jon Gass: mixer
 Paul Boutin, Dave Hancock: assistant engineers (mixing)
 Randy Walker: midi programmer
 Ivy Skoff: production coordinator

Charts

Weekly charts

Year-end charts

Certifications

Release history

See also
 R&B number-one hits of 1996 (USA)

References

1996 debut singles
1996 songs
Arista Records singles
Az Yet songs
LaFace Records singles
Song recordings produced by Babyface (musician)
Songs written by Babyface (musician)